Salmanabad (also Romanized as Salmānābād; also known as Soleymānābād) is a village in Avajiq-e Shomali Rural District, Dashtaki District, Chaldoran County, West Azerbaijan Province, Iran. At the 2006 census, its population was 24, in 7 families.

References 

Populated places in Chaldoran County